Guzmania barbiei is a species of plant in the family Bromeliaceae. It is endemic to Ecuador.  Its natural habitat is subtropical or tropical dry forests. It is threatened by habitat loss.

References

Flora of Ecuador
barbiei
Data deficient plants
Taxonomy articles created by Polbot